The Seaborn M. Shankle House, at 125 Cherry St in Commerce, Georgia, was built in 1840s and expanded in the 1870s.  It was listed on the National Register of Historic Places in 1979.

The main portion of the house, an Italianate addition in the late 1870s, is a two-story square building.

References

National Register of Historic Places in Jackson County, Georgia
Italianate architecture in Georgia (U.S. state)
Houses completed in 1875